Stoke is a municipality in Le Val-Saint-François in the Estrie region of Quebec in Canada.

History

Stoke was first known in 1792 as Cowan's Clearance in memory of Moses Cowan, who surveyed the land for the British Crown. The Township was abandoned until 1837 due to a lack of interest, and passed into the hands of the British American Land Company. In 1856, thanks to the Stoke Road and the road that would soon lead to Sherbrooke, the territory was opened to settlement.

A testimony to the repeated efforts of its citizens, Stoke boasts the neo-Gothic Saint-Philémon Church (1892).

Demographics

Population

Language
Mother tongue (2011)

Local government
List of former mayors:

 Bertrand Ducharme (2003–2009)
 Luc Cayer (2009–present)

See also
List of municipalities in Quebec

References

External links

Municipalities in Quebec
Incorporated places in Estrie